Henryk Alszer (7 May 1918 in Chorzów – 31 December 1959 in Ruda Śląska) was a Polish footballer. He was part of the Polish national team who were at the 1952 Summer Olympics.

Before the war he participated in several sports for the sports and athletic club of RKS Hajduki, but due to the war he, like several others, found himself unable to play football. After the war he went to France to play for RC Lens and to Scotland to play for Forres Mechanics. He returned home in 1947 to play for Ruch Chorzów and aided them to a championship titles in 1951, 1952 and 1953. When he departed from the team in 1958 he had scored 51 goals in 176 matches, and though he moved to Górnik Katowice, he took on more of a coaching role than a playing one.

Alszer played in fourteen international matches, the first of which was against Yugoslavia in 1948.

References

External links
 olimpijski

1918 births
1959 deaths
Sportspeople from Chorzów
Polish footballers
Ruch Chorzów players
RC Lens players
Poland international footballers
Olympic footballers of Poland
Footballers at the 1952 Summer Olympics
Forres Mechanics F.C. players
People from the Province of Silesia
Association football forwards